Diego Appollis (born 27 August 2000) is a South African rugby union player for the  in the Currie Cup. His regular position is centre.

Appollis was named in the  side for the 2022 Currie Cup Premier Division.

References

South African rugby union players
Living people
Rugby union centres
Blue Bulls players
2000 births
Rugby union players from the Western Cape
Bulls (rugby union) players
Pumas (Currie Cup) players
Rugby sevens players at the 2018 African Youth Games